This was the first edition of the tournament.

Alison Van Uytvanck won the title, defeating Sara Errani 6–4, 6–3 in the final.

Seeds

Draw

Finals

Top half

Bottom half

References

External links
Main Draw

Veneto Open - Singles